"Les Menottes (Tching Tchang Tchong)" is a song written and performed by Algerian and French rapper L'Algérino. The song was recorded in 2017 in Marseille, France, and released on May 5, 2017.

Music video 
The song was released on YouTube on May 5, 2017 and was filmed in Marseille.

Charts

Certifcations

References 

French songs
2017 singles
2017 songs